Dichomeris metatoxa is a moth in the family Gelechiidae. It was described by Edward Meyrick in 1935. It is found in southern India.

The larvae feed on Bauhinia vahlii.

References

Moths described in 1935
metatoxa